Andrew B. Christenson (1869–1931) was the president of Ricks Academy from 1914 to 1917.  

Christenson was born in Manti, Utah.  He graduated from Brigham Young Academy. In 1896 he married Sarah Jane Barholowmew (1875–1966) in the Manti Temple. Christenson was then a teacher and principal in Kanab, Utah.  He later studied at the University of Michigan where he received a BA in Literature in 1901.  

Christenson served as principal of LDS High School, the predecessor of LDS Business College, and was on the faculty of Brigham Young University before coming to Ricks College. During his term as president of Ricks the school first offered college level courses.

Christenson was a member of the Church of Jesus Christ of Latter-day Saints.

Sources
BYU-Idaho bio of Christenson

1869 births
People from Manti, Utah
Brigham Young Academy alumni
University of Michigan College of Literature, Science, and the Arts alumni
Ensign College faculty
Brigham Young University faculty
Presidents of Brigham Young University–Idaho
1931 deaths